Roland Spångberg (4 February 1923 – 9 May 2011) was a Swedish water polo player. He competed at the 1948 Summer Olympics and the 1952 Summer Olympics.

References

1923 births
2011 deaths
Swedish male water polo players
Olympic water polo players of Sweden
Water polo players at the 1948 Summer Olympics
Water polo players at the 1952 Summer Olympics
Sportspeople from Stockholm